Argina is a genus of tiger moths in the family Erebidae. They are distributed throughout Africa, Mauritius, China, India, Sri Lanka, Myanmar, Andaman Islands, New Guinea and Australia.

Description
Palpi upturned, reaching the vertex of head with short third joint. Antennae ciliated in both sexes. Mid and hind tibia with minute terminal spur pairs. Hindwing of male with a fold on inner margin containing a glandular patch near the base, with a tuft of long hair beyond it. The anal angle produced to a point. Forewing with veins 3 to 5 from close to angle of cell. Vein 6 from upper angle. Veins 7 and 10 from a long areole formed by the anastomosis of vein 8 and 9. Hindwing with veins 3 to 5 from angle of cell. Veins 6 and 7 from upper angle. Vein 8 from middle of cell.

Taxonomy
Not long ago it was divided into three genera: Argina (A. cribraria), Alytarchia (A. amanda, A. leonina), Mangina (M. argus, M. syringa, M. pulchra).

Species
The genus includes the following species:
 Argina amanda (Boisduval, 1847)
 Argina argus (Kollar, [1847])
 Argina astrea (Drury, 1773)
 Argina leonina (Walker, [1865])
 Argina pantheraria (Felder, 1874)

Former species
For Argina argus, the new genus Mangina Kaleka & Kirti, 2001 was described. This genus also contains (Dubatolov, 2010):
 Mangina syringa (Cramer, 1775)
 Mangina pulchra (C. Swinhoe, 1892)

References

Dubatolov, V. V. (2010). Tiger-moths of Eurasia (Lepidoptera, Arctiidae) (Nyctemerini by Rob de Vos & Vladimir V. Dubatolov). Neue Entomologische Nachrichten. Marktleuthen. 65: 1–106.
Kaleka, A.S. & Kirti J.S. (2001) A new genus Mangina along with the taxonomy of Argina Hubner (Arctiinae: Arctiidae: Lepidoptera). Journal of the Bombay Natural History Society 98 (2): 250–253.

Nyctemerina
Moth genera